Carissa is a genus of shrubs.

Carissa may also refer to:
Carissa (name), a name of Greek origin given to girls
Carissa (Spain), an ancient town in Spain
Carissa (Galatia), an ancient town in Galatia, Turkey
Carissa (moth), synonym of the moth genus Batracharta in the family Erebidae
New Carissa, a merchant ship which foundered in 1999
Carissa, a doll in the Groovy Girls doll line, by Manhattan Toy
"Carissa", a song by Sun Kil Moon from Benji (2014)